Pseudopaludicola boliviana is a species of frog in the family Leptodactylidae. It is found in Argentina, Bolivia, Brazil, Colombia, Guyana, Paraguay, Suriname, and Venezuela. Its natural habitats are subtropical or tropical dry forests, subtropical or tropical moist lowland forests, moist savanna, subtropical or tropical seasonally wet or flooded lowland grassland, swamps, freshwater marshes, intermittent freshwater marshes, pastureland, ponds, irrigated land, and seasonally flooded agricultural land.

References

boliviana
Amphibians of Argentina
Amphibians of Bolivia
Amphibians of Brazil
Amphibians of Colombia
Amphibians of Guyana
Amphibians of Paraguay
Amphibians of Suriname
Amphibians of Venezuela
Taxonomy articles created by Polbot
Amphibians described in 1927